Heteroponera inca is a species of ant in the genus Heteroponera. Endemic to Colombia, it was described by William Louis Brown Jr. in 1958.

References

External links

Heteroponerinae
Hymenoptera of South America
Insects described in 1958